The 1948 All-SEC football team consists of American football players selected to the All-Southeastern Conference (SEC) chosen by various selectors for the 1948 college football season. Georgia won the conference.

All-SEC selections

Ends
Barney Poole, Ole Miss (AP-1, UP-1)
George Broadnax, Georgia Tech (AP-1, UP-2)
Jim Powell, Tennessee (AP-2, UP-1)
Abner Wimberly, LSU (AP-2)
Rebel Steiner, Alabama (UP-2)
Wallace Jones, Kentucky (AP-3)
Richard Sheffield, Tulane (AP-3)

Tackles
Norman Meseroll, Tennessee (AP-1, UP-1)
Paul Lea, Tulane (AP-1, UP-2)
Porter Payne, Georgia (AP-2, UP-1)
Bob Gain, Kentucky (AP-2)
Carl Copp, Vanderbilt (UP-2)
Wayne Cantrell, Vanderbilt (AP-3)
W. Matthews, Georgia Tech (AP-3)

Guards
Bill Healy, Georgia Tech (AP-1, UP-1)
Jimmy Crawford, Ole Miss (AP-1, UP-1)
Ken Cooper, Vanderbilt (AP-2)
Dennis Doyle, Tulane (AP-2)
Bernie Reid, Georgia (UP-2)
Wren Worley, LSU (UP-2)
Homer Hobbs, Georgia (AP-3)
James Vugrin, Tennessee (AP-3)

Centers
John Clark, Vanderbilt (AP-1, UP-2)
Jimmy Kynes, Florida (UP-1)
Hal Herring, Auburn (AP-2)
Ed Claunch, LSU (AP-3)

Quarterbacks
John Rauch, Georgia (College Football Hall of Fame) (AP-1, UP-1)
Farley Salmon, Ole Miss (AP-2, UP-2)

Halfbacks
Chuck Hunsinger, Florida (AP-1, UP-1)
Shorty McWilliams, Miss. St. (AP-1, UP-2)
Joe Geri, Georgia (AP-3, UP-1)
Herb Rich, Vanderbilt (AP-2)
Hal Littleford, Tennessee (AP-2)
Harper Davis, Miss. St. (AP-3)
Billy Cadenhead, Alabama (AP-3)
Bob McCoy, Georgia Tech (AP-3)

Fullbacks
Eddie Price, Tulane (College Football Hall of Fame) (AP-1, UP-1)
Frank Ziegler, Georgia Tech (AP-2, UP-2)

Key

AP = Associated Press.

UP = United Press

Bold = Consensus first-team selection by both AP and UP

See also
1948 College Football All-America Team

References

All-SEC
All-SEC football teams